Bijlsma is a hybrid Dutch-Frisian metonymic originally meaning "axe man". Documented origins involve a carpenter and butcher. People with this surname, often spelled Bylsma abroad, include:

 Anner Bijlsma (born 1934), Dutch cellist
 Carine Bijlsma (born 1983), Dutch documentary film maker and photographer
 Gerrit Bijlsma (1929–2004), Dutch Olympic water polo player

See also 
 Bylsma, a spelling more common outside of the Netherlands

References 

Dutch-language surnames